The Virginia Wing of the Civil Air Patrol (CAP) is the highest echelon of Civil Air Patrol in the state of Virginia. Virginia Wing headquarters are located in Richmond, Virginia. The Virginia Wing consists of over 2,000 cadet and adult members at over 24 locations across the state of Virginia.

Mission
The Civil Air Patrol has three primary missions set forth by the United States Congress: emergency services, cadet programs, and aerospace education.

Emergency services
The Civil Air Patrol performs emergency services missions, including search and rescue missions. Other emergency services missions include disaster relief, reconnaissance, and counter-drug along with transportation missions, all of which are support for homeland security. The CAP provides radio communications during disasters to maintain communication when commercial communications infrastructure is nonfunctional.

In May 2020, the Virginia Wing began assisting the Virginia National Guard in its response to the 2020 coronavirus pandemic by transporting coronavirus tests to and from the Eastern Shore.

Cadet programs
The CAP offers cadet programs for youth aged 12 to 21, which includes aerospace education, leadership training, physical fitness and moral leadership.

Virginia Wing cadets take part in activities including camping trips, model rocket launches, and fundraisers. In addition, cadets are eligible to participate in statewide activities such as an encampment, a week-long immersion into cadet life, held annually at Fort Pickett in Blackstone, VA. Cadets are also eligible to train for and participate in CAP emergency services operations. Cadets often serve as radio operators, ground team members, and mission base staffers. Cadets over the age of 18 can also serve on CAP aircrews.

Aerospace education
The Civil Air Patrol provides aerospace education to the public and its own members. Public education is offered through education programs directed toward the aviation community and the public at large.  Education for CAP members is an internally focused program directed primarily at cadet members as part of their training program.

Organization

See also
Virginia Air National Guard
Virginia Defense Force

References

External links
Virginia Wing Civil Air Patrol official website

Wings of the Civil Air Patrol
Education in Virginia
Military in Virginia